DNZ may refer to:

 Democratic People's Union (Demokratska narodna zajednica), political party in Bosnia and Herzegovina
 Denizli Çardak Airport, Turkey (by IATA code)
 Destination New Zealand, tourism television program
 Deutsche National Zeitung, German extreme-right newspaper
 Die Neue Zeit, socialist theoretical journal
 Saudi–Kuwaiti neutral zone (Divided [Neutral] Zone)